Reginald James Albert Askew (16 May 1928 – 9 April 2012) was a British Anglican priest and academic. He was Principal of Salisbury and Wells Theological College from 1973 to 1987, and Dean of King's College London from 1988 to 1993.

References

1928 births
2012 deaths
20th-century English Anglican priests
21st-century English Anglican priests
British chaplains
Deans of King's College London